Tin Karamatić (born 1 March 1993) is a Croatian football defender who plays for Croatian club Jarun.

Club career

Dinamo Zagreb
Starting off in the Dinamo Zagreb youth system, Karamatić moved through the club's ranks, winning league titles and the Croatian Youth Cup along the way.

He was included in the club's first team pre-season training and featured in several friendly matches before deciding in agreement with Dinamo Zagreb to move away to Inter Zaprešić for a better chance at playing first team experience.

Inter Zaprešić

His time at Inter Zaprešić was difficult because of an injury that kept him away from the football fields for a considerable amount of time. He did manage to be included in the club's squad list once he had returned to full fitness but decided in late 2012 to move to the Czech Republic instead of continuing in the Croatian 1. HNL.

Slovan Liberec

Once moving to Slovan Liberec Karamatić encountered some bureaucratic issues with his registration but overcame these and regularly played in the Slovan Liberec B team.

Olhanense
After a successful trial period at the club under the watchful eye of the club's managers, Abel Xavier, then Paulo Alves, in November 2013 Karamatić was signed on a three-year contract which will keep him at the club until 2016. He was, however, only allowed to play in official matches since 1 January 2014 due to registration limitations with the Portuguese Football Federation.

On 23 January 2014 Karamatić played a full 90 minutes for the club in an international friendly match against FC Lokomotiv Moscow.

On 31 January 2014 Tin participated in the 2014 Lunar New Year Cup in Hong Kong where his team finished 2nd. He started both matches of the 4 team tournament which included local team CitizenAA combined with Ecuadorian Serie A team Deportivo Cuenca, J.League team FC Tokyo and Russian Premier League team FC Krylia Sovetov Samara.

Olhanense won the semi-final 5–6 on penalties against FC Tokyo after drawing 1–1 in the regular 90 minutes. Tin played again in the final but saw his team lose 2–0 to Citizen Cuenca United.

SV Horn
After not playing for most of the 2019–20 season, on 8 August 2020 he joined Austrian club SV Horn.

Opatija
On 25 January 2021 he joined Croatian newly promoted second division team Opatija.

International career
Karamatić has represented both Croatia U17 and Croatia U19 national teams on various occasions, playing with many of his former Dinamo Zagreb teammates.

Career statistics

References

External links
 PrvaLiga profile 
 

1993 births
Living people
Footballers from Zagreb
Association football central defenders
Croatian footballers
Croatia youth international footballers
NK Inter Zaprešić players
FC Slovan Liberec players
S.C. Olhanense players
ŠK Senec players
S.C. Farense players
HŠK Zrinjski Mostar players
NK Zavrč players
NK Radomlje players
NK Ankaran players
NK Čelik Zenica players
NK Triglav Kranj players
SV Horn players
NK Opatija players
Croatian Football League players
2. Liga (Slovakia) players
Liga Portugal 2 players
Slovenian PrvaLiga players
Premier League of Bosnia and Herzegovina players
2. Liga (Austria) players
First Football League (Croatia) players
Croatian expatriate footballers
Croatian expatriate sportspeople in Portugal
Croatian expatriate sportspeople in Romania
Croatian expatriate sportspeople in Slovakia
Croatian expatriate sportspeople in the Czech Republic
Croatian expatriate sportspeople in Bosnia and Herzegovina
Croatian expatriate sportspeople in Slovenia
Croatian expatriate sportspeople in Austria
Expatriate footballers in Portugal
Expatriate footballers in Romania
Expatriate footballers in Slovakia
Expatriate footballers in the Czech Republic
Expatriate footballers in Bosnia and Herzegovina
Expatriate footballers in Slovenia
Expatriate footballers in Austria